is a Japanese artist. He is best known as the lead character and mecha designer for the Metal Gear franchise. He has collaborated with Hideo Kojima on each of his games.

Biography
Shinkawa was born in Hiroshima on 25 December 1971. He began working at Konami after graduating from Kyoto Seika University. He first worked as a debugger for the PC-98 version of Policenauts. He moved on to serve as art director for the later console ports of the game, then as the lead character and mecha designer for the Metal Gear series. He served as the art director for all Metal Gear Solid games, while providing character designs for Metal Gear Solid: Portable Ops and Metal Gear Rising: Revengeance. He is the lead artist and character designer for Kojima Productions.

Shinkawa was inspired by anime and manga artists like Yoshikazu Yasuhiko and Yoshitaka Amano, and western artists such as Frank Miller, Aubrey Beardsley and Willy Pogany. He drew inspiration from French artists such as Mœbius. Shinkawa used felt-tip pens, especially the Pentel Brush Pen, as well as Adobe Photoshop and Corel Painter. He is a fan of heavy metal, and artists such as Megadeth, Rage, Killswitch Engage and Yngwie Malmsteen.

Works

Video games

Other works
Novels
Urban Hercules (illustrations)
Metal Gear Solid: Peace Walker (cover and interior illustrations)
Metal Gear Solid Substance I: Shadow Moses (cover illustration)
Metal Gear Solid Substance II: Manhattan (cover illustration)
Metal Gear Solid: The Phantom Pain (cover illustration)
Point of Impact (cover illustration, 2013 Fusosha Mystery edition)

Films
Godzilla: Final Wars (monster and mecha designs)
Pacific Rim (Poster design, Japanese release)

Toys
Frame Arms/Frame Arms Girl (mecha/character design for Byakko)

Trading Cards
Magic: The Gathering – Kamigawa: Neon Dynasty (Satoru Umezawa)
Magic: The Gathering – Special Guest: Yoji Shinkawa Secret Lair (Phyrexian Metamorph, Tezzeret the Seeker, Skullclamp, Solemn Simulacrum)

References

Bibliography
 The Art of Metal Gear Solid
 The Art of Metal Gear Solid 2
 The Art of Metal Gear Solid 1.5
 The Art of Metal Gear Solid: The Original Trilogy
 Metal Gear Solid 4: Guns of the Patriots: Master Art Work
 Metal Gear Solid: Peace Walker: Official Art Works
 The Art of Metal Gear Solid V
 Visual Works of Anubis: Zone of the Enders
 The Art of Yoji Shinkawa Volumes 1-3

External links

1971 births
Japanese illustrators
Konami people
Living people
Video game artists